Fontana is an administrative unit of Malta, on the island of Gozo, with a population of 985 people (as of March 2014).

History

Fontana originated from the suburb of Victoria on the Rabat-Xlendi road. Its local name is "It-Triq tal-Għajn", (the way to the spring), and it took its name from a spring at the bottom of the road leading to Xlendi, known locally as "l-Għajn il-Kbira", (the big spring). Fontana is the Italian word for a spring.

On the lower part of Fontana, on the right-hand side of the road to Xlendi, one cannot help but notice the evergreen Lunzjata Valley going up to the village of Kerċem. Local farmers are busy around all year long in this fertile part of Gozo.

The People
Most of the fishermen that operated from the fishing village of Xlendi lived in Fontana. Also, some other people used to go hunting in the adjacent Lunzjata Valley. Later in the nineteenth century, they began setting aside part of the proceeds from their catches to construct a church.

Zones in Fontana
Is-Saqwi 
Tal-Għajn 
Wied tal-Lunzjata
Wied Siekel
Ix-Xari
Manresa
Santa Duminka

The Sacred Heart Catholic Church in Fontana

The foundation stone of the church was laid on 29 January 1893. The church was consecrated twelve years to that day on 29 January 1905, and was dedicated to the Sacred Heart of Jesus. The church was established as the parish of Fontana on 27 March 1911 under Bishop Giovanni Maria Camilleri. The spectacular village feast is celebrated each year around the 2nd and 3rd week of June. The Sacred Heart Catholic Church in Fontana is also a parish church, and considered to be a national sanctuary of the Sacred Heart.

L-Għajn il-Kbira - The Big Spring
 
Arched shelters were built in the sixteenth century over the springs for the convenience of people when washing their clothes. A very old irrigation system made up from stone gutters constantly brings water from a spring situated in the Kerċem part of the valley.

Fireworks
The village of Fontana always been known to have fireworks enthusiasts. The start of it all was a certain short and quiet man, Ninu Farrugia, who had brought the skill of pyrotechnics from Malta. He was a prime master in fireworks and performed technical work in this skill with great skill and precision. His children later on continued this work. The Fontana Brothers, a number of youths from Fontana helped Ninu, and by time also turned into experts in this dangerous craft. Over time this group became champions in Gozo for constructing fireworks for the Sacred Heart feast. Although Fontana was a small village, the amount of fireworks that was produced for the festival would be greater than that of other villages in Gozo. Thousands of people attended the feast to follow the infernal box that had a certain rhythm and quality. Fontana Brothers was the Brand name of Fontana and has been famous since the start. Some were obviously very proud because it meant expertise in pyrotechnics and courage which lead them creating bigger and better fireworks which could only be seen in Fontana. Those who make them and set these fireworks off from the fields, both were justifiable to celebrate their 'bravura' or their insanity during the march of the latter at the end of the feast. However a new organisation, 'Għaqda tan-Nar Fontana' was set up in 2014, following the 2010 tragedy at Farrugia Brothers Fireworks Factory that cost the lives of 5 people from Fontana. To this day, it is said that the village of Fontana still leads the pyrotechnics side of Gozo by setting up grand fireworks shows including them with vast variety of spectacular fireworks.

Shelters
Shelters were built beside the Springs. This was useful for the Fontanin to go for shelter when there were raids during World War II. This shelter started at the Springs and ended on a cliff overlooking Fontana.

Administration of the Local Council
Savior Borg (Mayor, PN)
Josephine Camilleri (PN)
Carmel Farrugia (PN)
Horace Micallef (PL)
Jonathan Cefai (PL)

References

External links

 Fontana Local Council Official Website
 Sacred Heart Parish Official Website

 
Populated places in Malta
Gozo
Local councils of Malta